This is the progression of world record improvements of the long jump W55 division of Masters athletics.

Key

References

External links
Masters Athletics Long Jump list

Masters athletics world record progressions
Long